Camae Ayewa, better known by her stage name Moor Mother, is an American poet, musician, and activist from Philadelphia, Pennsylvania. She is one half of the collective Black Quantum Futurism, along with Rasheedah Phillips, and co-leads the groups Irreversible Entanglements and 700 Bliss.

Early life and career
Ayewa was born in Aberdeen, Maryland, where she grew up in a public housing project. She moved to Philadelphia, Pennsylvania to study photography at the Art Institute.

In 2016, Moor Mother released a studio album, Fetish Bones, on Don Giovanni Records. The album, which was released alongside a 122-page book of poetry, was included on year-end lists by Pitchfork, Rolling Stone, and The Wire.

In 2017, she released a studio album, The Motionless Present, on The Vinyl Factory. It featured collaborations with Geng, DJ Haram, Mental Jewelry, and Rasheedah Phillips. The same year, she released a collaborative EP with Mental Jewelry, titled Crime Waves, on Don Giovanni Records.

She served as one of the guest curators at the 2018 Le Guess Who? music festival. In 2019, she released Analog Fluids of Sonic Black Holes.

Ayewa co-leads and provides lyrics and vocals for the "liberation-oriented free-jazz collective" Irreversible Entanglements. She met the quintet's members through musical and activist endeavors: bassist Luke Stewart shared bills with her band the Mighty Paradocs; saxophonist Keir Neuringer worked with Books Through Bars, whose events Ayewa has emceed; and the trio of Ayewa, Stewart, and Neuringer was followed by the duo of trumpeter Aquiles Navarro and drummer Tcheser Holmes at a 2015 Musicians Against Brutality event following the shooting of Akai Gurley. The group performed in the inaugural season of the Kennedy Center's "Direct Current" contemporary culture showcase, and their releases have been included in best-of lists in Magnet, NPR Music, The Quietus, and Stereogums "20 Best Jazz Albums Of The 2010s". The band's instrumentalists also performed on Ayewa's debut theatrical work, Circuit City.

In the fall of 2021, Ayewa began serving as an assistant professor at the University of Southern California's Thornton School of Music.

Discography

Studio albums
 Fetish Bones (2016)
 The Motionless Present (2017)
 Analog Fluids of Sonic Black Holes (2019)
 True Opera (2020) 
 Circuit City (2020)
 BRASS (2020) 
 Black Encyclopedia of the Air (Anti-, 2021)
 Jazz Codes (2022)

With Irreversible Entanglements

 Irreversible Entanglements (2017, International Anthem)
Who Sent You? (2020, International Anthem)
 Live in Italy (2020, self-released)
 Live in Berlin (2020, self-released)
 Open the Gates (2021, Don Giovanni / International Anthem)

With 700 Bliss 

 Spa 700 (2018)
 Nothing to Declare (2022)

Compilation albums
 Manufacture of Indigo (2015)
 Clepsydra (2020)
 Anthologia 01 (2020)

Live albums
 Offering: Live at Le Guess Who (2020)

EPs
 Crime Waves (2017)

Guest appearances
 Fhloston Paradigm - "...All" from After... (2017)
 Show Me the Body - "In a Grave" and "Everything Hate Here" from Corpus I (2017)
 Lushlife - "I've Seen It Before I Was There" from My Idols Are Dead + My Enemies Are in Power (2017)
 Eartheater - "MMXXX" from IRISIRI (2018)
 Reef the Lost Cauze - "Splinters" from The Majestic (2018)
 Screaming Females - "End of My Bloodline (Remix)" from Singles Too (2019)
 Art Ensemble of Chicago, We Are On the Edge (Pi, 2019)
 Zonal - "Body of Wire", "In a Cage", "System Error", "Medulla", "Catalyst", and "No Investigation" from Wrecked (2019)
 Harrga - "À Vif" from Héroïques Animaux de la Misère (2019)
 Armand Hammer - "Ramses II" from Shrines (2020)
Sons of Kemet - "Pick Up Your Burning Cross (feat. Moor Mother, Angel Bat Dawid)" from Black To The Future (2021)
The Bug - "Vexed (feat. Moor Mother)" from Fire (2021)
 madam data - "In the emptiness beyond emptinesses..." from The Gospel of the Devourer (PTP, 2021)
 Art Ensemble of Chicago, The Sixth Decade: From Paris to Paris (RogueArt, 2023)

Remixes
 Gonjasufi - "The Kill (Moor Mother Remix)" from Mandela Effect (2017)
 What Cheer? Brigade - "Iahabibi (Moor Mother Remix)" from You Can't See Inside of Me (2017)
 The Avalanches - "Because I'm Me (Moor Mother Remix)" from Because I'm Me (Remixes) (2018)

References

External links
    
 
 Moor Mother at Bandcamp
 

Living people
Year of birth missing (living people)
Poets from Pennsylvania
Musicians from Philadelphia
Activists from Philadelphia
Don Giovanni Records artists
Afrofuturists
African-American poets
American experimental musicians
21st-century American women musicians
People from Aberdeen, Maryland
African-American women musicians
21st-century African-American women
21st-century African-American musicians
Anti- (record label) artists